Charlton Templeman Speer (21 November 1859 – 27 October 1921) also known as Charlton T. Speer was an English composer and spiritualist.

Career

Speer was born in Cheltenham, he was the son of physician Stanhope Templeman Speer. During the 1870s, William Stainton Moses tutored Speer.

He became a successful composer and Professor of piano at the Royal Academy of Music. Like his father, Speer was a convinced spiritualist. He joined the London Spiritualist Alliance in March 1884.

He married Amy Matilda Hallett in 1887. He died in Sutton, London.

Compositions

Among his compositions were:

Zara, opera; 
Odysseus, opera; 
Hélène (opera); 
An opening in C for orchestra; 
The ballad Guinevere; 
The suite Cinderella for orchestra; 
The Mayor of Lake Regillus, for choir and orchestra; 
King Arthur symphonic poem; 
Pieces for piano, vocal melodies and religious music.

Publications

Biography of W. Stainton Moses. In Spirit teachings Through the Mediumship of William Stainton Moses (M.A., Oxon) (1894)

Notes

1859 births
1921 deaths
Alumni of the Royal Academy of Music
English spiritualists
Parapsychologists
People from Cheltenham